is a former Japanese football player.

Club statistics
Updated to 2 February 2018.

1Includes JFL/J2 Playoff.

References

External links

Profile at Grulla Morioka
Twitter account

1986 births
Living people
Juntendo University alumni
Association football people from Kanagawa Prefecture
Japanese footballers
J2 League players
J3 League players
Japan Football League players
Gainare Tottori players
Iwate Grulla Morioka players
Association football defenders